Lionel Charles McGarr (March 5, 1904 – November 3, 1988) was a lieutenant general in the United States Army. He was the last commander of Military Assistance Advisory Group – Vietnam.

Early life and start of military career
McGarr was born in Yuma, Arizona on March 5, 1904, and graduated from the United States Military Academy in 1928. After receiving his commission as a second lieutenant of infantry he served in command and staff positions of increasing rank and responsibility, including assignments in Hawaii, California and Georgia.

World War II
McGarr saw extensive combat in North Africa and Europe during World War II as commander of the 30th Infantry Regiment from October 1943 to December 1944, acting assistant division commander of the 3rd Infantry Division from December 1944 to January 1945, and again commander of the 30th Infantry Regiment from January to May 1945.

Post World War II
McGarr was assistant division commander of the 3rd Infantry Division from 1945 to 1946, and he graduated from the National War College in 1947, afterwards serving in the intelligence section of the Army General Staff.

In 1948 he was named commander of the 350th Infantry Regiment in Austria, in 1949 he became tactical inspector for U.S. Tactical Command in Austria, and from 1950 to 1951 he was U.S. Tactical Command's chief of staff.

Korean War
McGarr served in the  Korean War as assistant division commander of the 2nd Infantry Division in 1951 and later commander of Allied Prisoner of War Command – Korea. From October 1953 to May 1954 he was commander of the 7th Infantry Division.

Post Korean War
From June 1954 to June 1956 McGarr commanded the US Army Caribbean Command. He was then appointed commandant of the Army Command and General Staff College.

Service in South Vietnam
In September 1960 he was promoted to Lieutenant General and named commander of Military Assistance Advisory Group – Vietnam. He served at this post until July 1962 when, against McGarr's advice, U.S. military escalation began and he was succeeded by General Paul Harkins, who commanded MAAG-V's successor unit, Military Assistance Command – Vietnam.

Awards and decorations
His awards include the Distinguished Service Cross, two Distinguished Service Medals, three Silver Stars, three Legions of Merit, five Bronze Stars and seven Purple Hearts.

Citation for Distinguished Service Cross
The President of the United States takes pleasure in presenting the Distinguished Service Cross to Lionel C. McGarr, Colonel (Infantry), U.S. Army, for extraordinary heroism in connection with military operations against an armed enemy while serving with the 30th Infantry Regiment, 3d Infantry Division, in action against enemy forces on 6 September 1944. Colonel McGarr's outstanding leadership, personal bravery and zealous devotion to duty exemplify the highest traditions of the military forces of the United States and reflect great credit upon himself, the 3d Infantry Division, and the United States Army.

Headquarters, Seventh U.S. Army, General Orders No. 107 (1944)

Retirement and death
After leaving Vietnam McGarr retired at the Presidio, afterwards living in Lafayette, California until his death in San Francisco on November 3, 1988. He was buried at San Francisco National Cemetery, Section B, Site 1606A.

References

1904 births
1988 deaths
United States Army Infantry Branch personnel
United States Army generals
United States Army personnel of the Korean War
United States Army personnel of the Vietnam War
United States Military Academy alumni
United States Army Command and General Staff College alumni
National War College alumni
Recipients of the Distinguished Service Cross (United States)
Recipients of the Distinguished Service Medal (US Army)
Recipients of the Silver Star
Recipients of the Legion of Merit
People from Yuma, Arizona
United States Army generals of World War II